Marc Joseph Habscheid (born March 1, 1963) is a Canadian ice hockey coach and former National Hockey League player. Habscheid is the former head coach of the Prince Albert Raiders of the Western Hockey League. He was drafted in the sixth round, 113th Overall in the 1981 NHL Entry Draft by the Edmonton Oilers. He played 345 games in the NHL over parts of 10 seasons, amassing 72 goals and 163 points.

Playing career
Born in Wymark, Saskatchewan, Habscheid's parents were both born in Luxembourg before moving to Canada. Habscheid played three seasons with the Western Hockey League's Saskatoon Blades before turning pro. This included the 1981–82 campaign where Habscheid had 151 points, second only to Bruce Eakin in team scoring. He also played in the 1982 World Junior Hockey Championship, leading Canada to its first ever gold medal at the tournament. That season he played 7 games with the Oilers, scoring 4 points. He played 4 more seasons with the Oilers, before he was suspended by the team for refusing to report to the AHL's Nova Scotia Voyageurs and subsequently dealt to Minnesota in December 1985. Habscheid played 7 more NHL seasons with Minnesota, Detroit, and Calgary. He also represented Canada internationally twice, at the 1988 Winter Olympics and the 1992 World Championships. Habscheid went on to play 5 more seasons of hockey (2 in Switzerland, 2 with the IHL's Las Vegas Thunder, and one final season in 1995–96 with the DEL's Augsburger Panther). He retired officially in 1996.

Coaching career
Habscheid got his start in coaching in the Saskatchewan Junior Hockey League with the Melfort Mustangs. He then moved on to coach the Kamloops Blazers of the WHL. On November 29, 1999, he was named head coach of the Kelowna Rockets. Habscheid achieved great success with the Rockets. He won the Ed Chynoweth Cup in 2003 and a Memorial Cup in 2004. He was also named the CHL Coach of the Year in 2003.
Habscheid was also head coach of the 2003 Canadian World Junior team, becoming the first player to represent Canada at the tournament as both a player and coach. He was subsequently named head coach for all international tournaments on July 29, 2005. He won a gold medal at the World Championships in 2004 and silver in 2005. As well, Habscheid served as an assistant coach for Canada at the 2006 Turin Olympics. Habscheid also spent one season as an associate coach with the Boston Bruins. On June 3, 2009, Habschied was named as head coach and general manager of the Chilliwack Bruins, a major junior team in the Western Hockey League which has since moved to Victoria, British Columbia to become the Royals. On November 4, 2014, Habscheid returned to the WHL coaching ranks when he accepted the Prince Albert Raiders head coaching position.

Career statistics

Regular season and playoffs

International

Coaching record

Awards
 WHL Second All-Star Team – 1982

References

External links

1963 births
Augsburger Panther players
Boston Bruins coaches
Calgary Flames players
Canada men's national ice hockey team coaches
Canadian ice hockey coaches
Canadian ice hockey forwards
Canadian people of Luxembourgian descent
Chilliwack Bruins coaches
Detroit Red Wings players
Edmonton Oilers draft picks
Edmonton Oilers players
EV Zug players
Ice hockey people from Saskatchewan
Ice hockey players at the 1988 Winter Olympics
Kamloops Blazers coaches
Kamloops Junior Oilers players
Kelowna Rockets coaches
Las Vegas Thunder players
Living people
Minnesota North Stars players
Moncton Alpines (AHL) players
Nova Scotia Oilers players
Olympic ice hockey players of Canada
People from Swift Current
Prince Albert Raiders coaches
Saskatoon Blades players
SC Bern players
Springfield Indians players
Victoria Royals coaches
Wichita Wind players
Canadian expatriate ice hockey players in Germany
Canadian expatriate ice hockey players in Switzerland